The Myodocopida is one of the two orders within the Myodocopa, in turn a subclass of the Ostracoda. The Myodocopida are distinguished by a worm-like seventh limb, and, usually, a rostrum above an incisure (notch) from which the antennae can protrude. Unlike other ostracods, many species of the Myodocopida have lateral compound eyes Over the last thirty years there has been much research into the morphology, behaviour and distribution of myodocopids. More recently, DNA sequences have been used to investigate the phylogeny of various groups.

References

External links

 
Crustacean orders
Taxa named by Georg Ossian Sars